Md. Habibur Rahman is a Jatiya Party (Ershad) politician and the former Member of Parliament of Satkhira-2.

Career
Rahman was elected to parliament from Satkhira-2 as a Jatiya Party candidate in 1988.

References

Jatiya Party politicians
Living people
4th Jatiya Sangsad members
Year of birth missing (living people)